Swan Song Records is a label founded by the members of Led Zeppelin, on which they published their own music, as well as a number of acts signed to their company, most notably Bad Company and Dave Edmunds. Here is a list of singles released under their imprint:

Singles

"Can't Get Enough/Little Miss Fortune" – Bad Company:  SS-70015 (US, 1974), SWS 70015 (Canada)
"Is It Only Love/Joey" – Pretty Things:  SSK 19401 (UK, 6 November 1974)
"Movin' On/Easy On My Soul" – Bad Company:  SS-70101 (US, 18 Jan. 1975), SWS 70101 (Canada)
"Trampled Under Foot/Black Country Woman" – Led Zeppelin:  SS-70102 (US, 2 April 1975; Australia), DC-1 (UK, 10 May 1975), SSK 19 402(N) (Germany, March 1975), SS 19402 (Holland), K 19402 (Italy, April 1975), 19 402 (France), P-1361N (Japan, April 1975), P-108N (Japan), 45-1205 (Spain), SWS 70102 (Canada), SNS 100 (South Africa)
"Good Lovin' Gone Bad/Whiskey Bottle" – Bad Company:  SS-70103 (US, 19 April 1975), SWS 70103 (Canada)
"I'm Keeping.../Atlanta" – Pretty Things:  SSK 19403 (UK, 13 June 1975)
"Joey" – Pretty Things:  SS-70104 (US, April 1975), SSK 19404 (UK, 25 July 1975), 45-1214 (Spain)
"Wishing Well/Comin' On Strong" – Maggie Bell: SS-70105 (US, June 1975)
"Feel Like Makin' Love/Wild Fire Woman" – Bad Company:  SS-70106 (US, August 1975), SWS 70106 (Canada)
"Sad Eye/Remember That Boy" – Pretty Things:  SSK 19405 (UK, 20 February 1976)
"It isn't Rock 'N' Roll" – Pretty Things:  SS-70107 (US, March 1976), 98.001 (Brazil, 1977)
"Young Blood/Do Right By Your Woman" – Bad Company: SS-70108 (US, 20 March 1976), SWS 70108 (Canada)
"Tonight/It Isn't Rock 'N' Roll" – Pretty Things:  SSK 19406 (UK, 28 May 1976), SSK 19 406 (Germany, June 1976)
"Honey Child/Fade Away" – Bad Company:  SS-70109 (US, June 1976), SWS 70109 (Canada)
"Candy Store Rock/Royal Orleans" – Led Zeppelin:  SS-70110 (US, 18 June 1976), SSK 19 407 (Germany, August 1976), 45-1381 (Spain), P-35N (Japan, September 1976), SWS 70110 (Canada)
"Royal Orleans/Candy Store Rock" – Led Zeppelin:  19 407 (France)
"Here Comes The Weekend/As Lovers Do" – Dave Edmunds:  SSK 19408 (UK, 6 August 1976), SS 19 408 (Germany, September 1976), SS 19408 (Holland), 19 408 (France), 19408 (Belgium/Luxemburg)
"Where Or When/New York's A Lonely Town" – Dave Edmunds:  SSK 19409 (UK, 29 October 1976)
"Juju Man/What Did I Do Last Night" – Dave Edmunds:  SSK 19410 (UK, April 1977)
"Burnin' Sky/Everything I Need" – Bad Company:  SS 70112 (US, 21 May 1977), SWS 70112 (Canada)
"I Knew the Bride" – Dave Edmunds:  SSK 19411 (UK, June 1977), SS 19.411 (Germany, 7 August 1977), 45-1569 (Spain), SS 1698 (Australia)
"Little Darlin'/I Knew the Bride" – Dave Edmunds:  SS 70113 (US, June 1977)
"Recognition/Grim Reaper" – Detective:  SS 70114 (US, July 1977), P-207N (Japan, September 1977), SWS 70114 (Canada, August 1977)
"Get Out Of Denver/Worn Out Pockets, Brand New Suits" – Dave Edmunds: SS 70116 (US, August 1977)
"Something Beautiful/Dynamite" – Detective:  SS 70117 (US, March 1978)
"Hazell/Night Flighting" – Maggie Bell:  SSK 19412 (UK, March 1978), SSK 19412 P (UK picture disc, May 1979), SS 1859 (Australia)
"Deborah/What Looks Best on You" – Dave Edmunds:  SSK 19413 (UK, August 1978), SS 1970 (Australia)
"Television/Never Been in Love" – Dave Edmunds:  SSK 19414 (UK, October 1978)
"Trouble Boys/What Looks Best On You" – Dave Edmunds:  SS 70118 (US, November 1978), SS 19.415 (Holland)
"Rock 'N' Roll Fantasy/Crazy Circles" – Bad Company:  SS 70119 (US, March 1979; Canada; New Zealand), SSK 19416 (UK, 16 February 1979; Australia), SS 19 416 (Germany, March 1976), SS 19.416 (Holland), W 19416 (Italy), 19 416 (France, May 1979), 45-1835 (Spain), N-S-20-1 (Portugal), P-382N (Japan, March 1979), 200088 (Argentina)
"A1 on the Juke Box/It's My Own Business" – Dave Edmunds:  SSK 19417 (UK, February 1979)
"Gone, Gone, Gone/Take The Time" – Bad Company:  SS 71000 (US, July 1979; Canada, August 1979; New Zealand), P-453N (Japan, August 1979)
"Girls Talk" – Dave Edmunds:  SS 71001 (US & Canada, August 1979; New Zealand), SSK 19418 (UK, June 1979; Australia), SSK 19418 C (UK clear vinyl, 8 August 1979), SS 19 418 (Germany, August 1979), SS 19.418 (Holland/Belgium), 45-1898 (Spain)
"Queen of Hearts/The Creature From The Black Lagoon" – Dave Edmunds:  SSK 19419 (UK, September 1979; Australia), SS 19 419 (Germany, 26 October 1979), SS-19.419 (Holland/Belgium),
DJ SS 71002 (Canada)

"Crawling From The Wreckage" – Dave Edmunds:  SS 71002 (US, November 1979), SSK 19420 (UK,
10 October 1979)

"Fool in the Rain/Hot Dog" – Led Zeppelin:  SS 71003 (US, 7 December 1979; Canada; Australia; New Zealand), SS 19 421 (Germany, February 1980), SS 19.421 (Holland/Belgium), PROMO 097 (Italy),
W 19421 (Italy), 45-1925 (Spain), P-530N (Japan, February 1980)

"Singing The Blues/Boys Talk" – Dave Edmunds:  SSK 19422 (UK, January 1980; Australia),
SS 19422 (Germany, March 1980), 19 422 (France)

"All My Love" – Led Zeppelin :  11.105 (Brazil), DIF. 132 (Argentina)
"Hot Dog" – Led Zeppelin:  11.028 (Brazil)
"Rough Trade/Midnight Love" – Midnight Flyer:  SSK 19423 (UK, March 1981)
"Almost Saturday Night/You'll Never Get Me Up (In One Of Those)" – Dave Edmunds:  SS 72000 (US, March 1981), SSK 19424 (UK, 10 April 1981; Australia; New Zealand), SS 19 424 (Germany,
20 March 1981), SS 19424 (Holland/Belgium, April 1981; Portugal), 19 424 (France, May 1981), 45-2092 (Spain), SS72000 (Canada), SWS 102 (South Africa)

"In My Eyes/Midnight Love" – Midnight Flyer:  SS 72001 (US, May 1981)
"La Di Da/Love Today" – Sad Cafe:  SS 72002 (US, June 1981)
"The Race Is On" – Dave Edmunds with The Stray Cats:  SS 72003 (US, June 1981), SSK 19425 (UK, June 1981; Australia & New Zealand, August 1981; Ireland), SS 19 425 (Germany,
9 July 1981), SS 19425 (Holland/Belgium), 19425 (France)

"No Favours – No Way/I'm In Love Again" – Sad Cafe:  SS 72004 (US, October 1981)
"Hold Me/Spring Greens" – B. A. Robertson and Maggie Bell:  SS 72006 (US), BAM 1 (UK, October 1981; New Zealand), ELK 12 564 (Germany, 23 October 1981), ELK 12564 (Holland/Belgium), 45-2169 (Spain), PRO 72006 (Canada)
"Waiting For You/Rock 'N' Roll Party" – Midnight Flyer:  SSK 19426 (UK, April 1982)
"Who's To Blame (Death Wish Title)/Carole's Theme" – Jimmy Page:  P-1673 (Japan, July 1982)
"Slow Dancer/Burning Down One Side" – Robert Plant:  PS-1018 (Japan)
"Goosebumps/Key To Your Heart" – Maggie Bell:  SSK 19428 (UK, September 1982)
"Burning Down One Side" – Robert Plant:  SS7-99979 (US, September 1982), SSK 19429 (UK, September 1982), SSK 19429T (UK Limited Edition 12" single, September 1982), SS 19 429 (Germany, September 1982), SS 19.429 (Holland/Belgium), W 19429 (Italy), PRO 233 (France, October 1982), P-1679 (Japan, October 1982), 99 99797 (Canada), 7-99979 (Australia & New Zealand)
"Electricland" – Bad Company:  7-99966 (US, September 1982; Australia), 79,9966-7 (Germany), 79.9966-7 (Holland/Belgium), P-1713 (Japan, November 1982), 99 99667 (Canada)
"Pledge Pin/Fat Lip" – Robert Plant:  SS7-99952 (US, November 1982), 79 99527 (Canada)
"Crazy/All I Have To Do Is Dream" – Maggie Bell:  MB 1 (UK, January 1983)
"Put Angels Around You/Here, There And Everywhere" – Maggie Bell and Bobbie Whitlock:  SS7-99907 (US, March 1983), SWS 105 (South Africa)
"Big Log/Far Post" – Robert Plant:  7-99844 (US, September 1983; Australia), P-1786 (Japan, September 1983), 79 98447 (Canada)
"Somewhere In The Night/Sun Don't Shine" – Wildlife:  7-99842 (US, September 1983), B 9842 (UK, September 1983), PR 522 (US 12" promotional single)

Swan Song